Bill Freiberger is a writer and producer for such shows as The Simpsons, Drawn Together, The PJs, and Sonic Boom.

TV series' episodes written by Freiberger
Get a Life
"Roots"
"Paper Boy 2000"
Charlie Hoover
"Anniversary"
Bill & Ted's Excellent Adventures (live action)
"It's a Totally Wonderful Life"
Herman's Head
"How to Succeed in Business Without Really Dying"
"Guns 'n' Neurosis"
"Twisted Sister"
"Sperm 'n' Herman"
"The Waterton-gate Break-In"
"The One Wherein They Go on the Love Boat"
"Cat's in the Cradle"
"Love and the Single Parent"
"When Hermy Met Crawford's Daughter"
"When Hairy Met Hermy"
"When Hermy Met Maureen McCormick"
"When Hermie Met Crawford's Girlfriend"
Hardball
"My Name is Hard B"
"The Butt Winnick Story"
Thunder Alley
"Workin' Man's Blues"
Men Behaving Badly (a.k.a. It's a Man's World)
"I Am What I Am"
"Sarah's Vestigial Organ"
The Simpsons
"She of Little Faith"
The PJs
"The HJs"
"How the Super Stoled Christmas"
"Rich Man, Porn Man"
"Operation Gumbo Drop"
Drawn Together
"Xandir and Tim, Sitting in a Tree"
"Ghostesses in the Slot Machine"
"Terms of Endearment"
Sonic Boom
"Robots from the Sky: Part 1"
"Robots from the Sky: Part 2"
"Robots from the Sky: Part 3"
"Robots from the Sky: Part 4"

Voices
Sonic Boom - Comedy Chimp, Lady Walrus

External links

References 

American television writers
American male television writers
Living people
Year of birth missing (living people)